Are You Old Enough may refer to:

 "Are You Old Enough?", a 1978 song by Dragon
 Are You Old Enough (album), a 1983 compilation album by Dragon